Lesley Beck (born 10 July 1964 in Glasgow) is a British former alpine skier who competed in the 1984 Winter Olympics and in the 1988 Winter Olympics.
Beck finished in 10th place in the Women's Slalom at the 1987 Alpine World Ski Championships. Her height is 152 cm. She is affiliated to the Bearsden Ski Club in Glasgow.

References

External links
 

1964 births
Living people
Sportspeople from Glasgow
Scottish female alpine skiers
Olympic alpine skiers of Great Britain
Alpine skiers at the 1984 Winter Olympics
Alpine skiers at the 1988 Winter Olympics